is a former Japanese football player.

Club statistics

References

External links

jsgoal

1987 births
Living people
Association football people from Kanagawa Prefecture
Japanese footballers
J1 League players
Singapore Premier League players
JEF United Chiba players
Albirex Niigata Singapore FC players
YSCC Yokohama players
Iwate Grulla Morioka players
Japanese expatriate footballers
Association football midfielders